Eurema upembana is a butterfly in the family Pieridae. It is found in the Democratic Republic of the Congo (upper Lomami) and Tanzania. The habitat consists of montane grassland and forests.

References

Butterflies described in 1981
upembana